Mukhtaran may refer to:
Mukhtaran Bibi, Pakistani rape victim
Mukhtaran, Iran, a village in South Khorasan Province, Iran